Jagadeesh Kumar is an Indian playback singer. He was nominated for an Edison Award for Best Male Playback Singer in 2015 for the song "Silatta Pilatta" from the Tamil film Kanchana 2 (2015).

Early life 
Jagadeesh Kumar started his music career at the age of 16. He graduated from Loyola College, Chennai with an M.A. in Media Arts and Visual Communication. He then joined K. M. Music Conservatory to improve his skills in Opera and Carnatic music.

Career 
Kumar found a breakthrough after his work was recognised in the movie Sonnaa Puriyadhu (2013) in which he sang the song "Kelu Maganae Kelu" and then in the horror comedy super hit film Kanchana 2 (2015) for the song "Sillaatta Pillaata". His recent work is for the Song "I want to Marry" for the upcoming movie, "Charlie Chaplin 2".

Filmography

References

External links 

 Play back singer Jagadeesh Gets A Turning Point

Loyola College, Chennai alumni
Indian film score composers
Living people
Musicians from Chennai
1985 births